Juncaria is a genus of moths of the family Erebidae. The genus was erected by Francis Walker in 1858.

The Global Lepidoptera Names Index also gives this name as a synonym of Hyamia Walker, 1859.

Species
Juncaria atlantica Herrich-Schäffer, 1855
Juncaria melanothalama Hampson, 1926

References

Calpinae